Pablo Franco Dolci (born 1 January 1984) is an Argentine professional football midfielder who plays for Deportivo Maipú in the Torneo Federal A.

External links
 Argentine Primera statistics at Fútbol XXI 
 

Living people
1984 births
Argentine footballers
Argentine expatriate footballers
Association football wingers
Argentine Primera División players
Primera Nacional players
Torneo Federal A players
Ligue 1 players
Ligue 2 players
OGC Nice players
SC Bastia players
Chacarita Juniors footballers
Newell's Old Boys footballers
Ferro Carril Oeste footballers
Sportivo Belgrano footballers
Independiente Rivadavia footballers
Deportivo Maipú players
Argentine expatriate sportspeople in France
Expatriate footballers in France
Sportspeople from Córdoba Province, Argentina